This article presents a list of the historical events and publications of Australian literature during 1969.

Major publications

Books 
 Mena Calthorpe – The Defectors
 Jon Cleary – Remember Jack Hoxie
 Dymphna Cusack – The Half-Burnt Tree
 Sumner Locke Elliott – Edens Lost
 George Johnston – Clean Straw for Nothing
 Thomas Keneally – The Survivor
 D'Arcy Niland – Dead Men Running

Short stories 
 Manning Clark – Disquiet and Other Stories
Lyndall Hadow –  Full Cycle and Other Stories
 T. A. G. Hungerford – "Wong Chu and the Queen's Letterbox"
 Frank Moorhouse – Futility and Other Animals
 Dal Stivens – Selected Stories 1936-1968

Children's and Young Adult fiction 
 Hesba Brinsmead – Isle of the Sea Horse
 Joan Phipson – Peter and Butch
 Ivan Southall – Finn's Folly
 Eleanor Spence – Jamberoo Road
 Colin Thiele – Blue Fin

Poetry 

 Bruce Beaver – Letters to Live Poets
 Gwen Harwood
 "Barn Owl"
 "Father and Child"
 A. D. Hope – New Poems 1956-1969
 James McAuley – Surprises of the Sun
 David Malouf – "The Year of the Foxes"
 Les Murray – The Weatherboard Cathedral
 Thomas Shapcott – Inwards to the Sun : Poems
 Randolph Stow – A Counterfeit Silence: Selected Poems

Plays 

 Dorothy Hewett - Mrs Porter and the Angel

Awards and honours

Literary

Children and Young Adult

Poetry

Births 
A list, ordered by date of birth (and, if the date is either unspecified or repeated, ordered alphabetically by surname) of births in 1969 of Australian literary figures, authors of written works or literature-related individuals follows, including year of death.

 1 April – Larissa Behrendt, novelist and academic
 23 October – Trudi Canavan, novelist

Unknown date

 Tegan Bennett Daylight, novelist

Deaths 
A list, ordered by date of death (and, if the date is either unspecified or repeated, ordered alphabetically by surname) of deaths in 1969 of Australian literary figures, authors of written works or literature-related individuals follows, including year of birth.

 8 July – Charmian Clift, novelist (born 1923)
 12 July — Henry George Lamond, novelist (born 1885)
 4 September – Emily Bulcock, poet and journalist (born 1877)
 2 October – Katharine Susannah Prichard, novelist (born 1883)
 11 October – Marie Bjelke Petersen, novelist (born 1874)
 21 November – Norman Lindsay, novelist and artist (born 1879)
 27 November – May Gibbs, writer for children (born 1877)

Unknown date
 Kathleen Dalziel, poet (born 1881)

See also 
 1969 in Australia
 1969 in literature
 1969 in poetry
 List of years in Australian literature
 List of years in literature

References

 
Australian literature by year
20th-century Australian literature
1969 in literature